Ravenswood High School is a public school in Ravenswood, West Virginia. It serves students in grades 9 through 12 and is operated by the Jackson County School District.

Academics 
Ravenswood offers Advanced Placement courses.

Athletics 
Ravenswood athletic teams are nicknamed the Red Devils and compete in the Little Kanawha Conference.

Performing arts 
RHS has a competitive show choir, "Rave Revue". The group won a West Virginia state championship in 2018 amidst a slew of contest wins.

Notable alumni 
 Paul Fletcher, professional baseball player

References

External links 
 

Public high schools in West Virginia
Schools in Jackson County, West Virginia